Louisiana Baptist University (LBU) is a independent Baptist conservative Christian university located in Shreveport, Louisiana.

LBU has both an on-campus program and a distance education program which teaches subjects pertaining to the Bible and Baptist theology.  The school houses five departments: School of Biblical Studies, School of Communications (Leadership), School of Christian Counseling, School of Christian Education, and Theological Seminary.

History
In 1973, Baptist Christian University was founded by Jimmy G. Tharpe (1930–2008) as part of the Baptist Tabernacle, offering distance education for full-time ministers to complete degrees without leaving their pastorates. In February 1993, the trustees restructured the school's charter and changed the name to Louisiana Baptist University.

Kathleen Blanco, then governor of Louisiana, declared the month of April 2005 as "Louisiana Baptist University Month".

In its beginning, LBU was housed in the Centrum Building on Hollywood Avenue. It later relocated to a  facility off Interstate 20 at 6301 Westport Avenue in the center of West Shreveport, where the campus remains today.

In May 2013, the university expanded their campus with the completion of the Neal Weaver Conference Center. The center is equipped with the latest audio/video equipment which enables the university to host webinars in addition to their conferences.

Accreditation 
LBU is not currently accredited by any accrediting body recognized by the United States Department of Education. Because this university only grants non-secular degrees for use in various areas of ministry, it operates under religious-exempt status in Louisiana and is recognized by the Louisiana Board of Regents to grant degrees. LBU is a member of Association of Christian Schools International (ACSI). LBU is also an approved university of Baptist Bible Fellowship International (BBFI), which consists of 4,500 congregations totaling 1.2 million members associated with it; an additional 10,000 churches are associated worldwide.

Academics and staff
The school employs around forty faculty and staff. The current President of LBU is Dr. Greg Lyons.

Alumni 
Seminary

 Carl Baugh – author and founder of Pacific International University.
 Mal Couch – author and founder of Tyndale Theological Seminary.
 Rick Scarborough – author, activist, and founder of Vision America.

University

Larry Bagley – member of the Louisiana House of Representatives for District 7
 Bob Cornuke  – author and director of the Bible Archaeology Search and Exploration Institute (BASE).
 Bill Gothard – former president of the Institute in Basic Life Principles

 Grant Jeffrey  – author and teacher
 Roland S. Martin – American journalist, syndicated columnist, and author.
 Chuck Missler - author and founder/operator of Koinonia Institute
 Robert Morey – author and founder of the unaccredited California Biblical University and Seminary.
 Mark Tronson – businessman 
 Adrienne Southworth - member of the Kentucky Senate for District 7

See also
 Higher education accreditation in the United States

References

External links
 

Educational institutions established in 1973
Independent Baptist universities and colleges in the United States
Unaccredited Christian universities and colleges in the United States
Distance education institutions based in the United States
Universities and colleges in Shreveport, Louisiana
Private universities and colleges in Louisiana
Buildings and structures in Shreveport, Louisiana
1973 establishments in Louisiana